The 1929–30 Egypt Cup was the ninth edition of the Egypt Cup.

The final was held on 16 May 1930. The match was contested by Al Ahly and Al Ittihad Alexandria, with Al Ahly winning 2–0.

Quarter-finals

Semi-finals

Final

References 

 

2